Jack Lloyd Yerman (born February 5, 1939) is an American former athlete and winner of the gold medal in the  relay at the 1960 Summer Olympics.

Jack Yerman was sixth in the 400 m at the 1959 Pan-American Games and won the silver medal as a member of an American  relay team.

He won the 1960 U.S. Olympic Trials 400 m at Stanford with a time of 46.3, but at the Olympics itself, he only reached the semifinals. Jack Yerman won a gold medal as the lead-off runner with the American  relay team and set a new world record of 3:02.2.

Yerman also played fullback for Berkeley in the Rose Bowl.  Previously he ran for Woodland High School in Woodland, California, finishing third at the 1956 CIF California State Meet.

Yerman lives in Paradise, California. He is a retired high school teacher and father of four.

He is a Latter-day Saint. Yerman joined the Church of Jesus Christ of Latter-day Saints after his participation in the Olympics.

World records
 Mile Relay
 1600 Meter Relay
 Two Mile Relay
 Distance Medley Relay
 Indoor 400 Meter short track
 660 yard sprint (unofficial)

Major events
 Olympic Gold Medal – 1600 meter relay 1960
 Rose Bowl 1960
 Pan American Games
 (only Jack Yerman and Bob Mathias have accomplished all three of the above)
 First US-USSR dual meet, 1958
 Two Time Donkey Derby Champion

References

1939 births
Living people
American football fullbacks
American male sprinters
Athletes (track and field) at the 1960 Summer Olympics
California Golden Bears football players
California Golden Bears men's track and field athletes
Olympic gold medalists for the United States in track and field
Medalists at the 1960 Summer Olympics
Sportspeople from Oroville, California
Track and field athletes from California
American Latter Day Saints
Converts to Mormonism
People from Paradise, California
Pan American Games medalists in athletics (track and field)
Pan American Games silver medalists for the United States
Athletes (track and field) at the 1959 Pan American Games
Medalists at the 1959 Pan American Games